The William R. Bateman House is a historic house located at 148 Monroe Road in Quincy, Massachusetts.

Description and history 
The -story, wood-framed house was built in the 1890s for William Bateman, Boston-based wool dealer. The large Queen Anne style house is located in President's Hill, at that time a fashionable neighborhood for upper-class local and Boston businessmen. The house as a complex roofline and massing, and its first floor and porch are built out of fieldstone, a rare use of the material in the area.

The house was listed on the National Register of Historic Places on September 20, 1989.

See also
National Register of Historic Places listings in Quincy, Massachusetts

References

Houses in Quincy, Massachusetts
Queen Anne architecture in Massachusetts
Houses completed in 1890
National Register of Historic Places in Quincy, Massachusetts
Houses on the National Register of Historic Places in Norfolk County, Massachusetts